Rhabdocline weirii is a fungal plant pathogen. The pathogen, along with Rhabdocline pseudotsugae, causes Rhabdocline needlecast; R. weirii only affects Douglas-fir trees.  The disease causes the needles of the tree to discolor and eventually fall from the tree. The pathogen often makes Douglas-fir trees unsalable as Christmas trees and affects the Christmas tree farming industry.

References

External links 
 Index Fungorum
 USDA ARS Fungal Database

Fungal tree pathogens and diseases
Helotiales